Brezovica is a village in the Municipality of Šmarješke Toplice in southeastern Slovenia. It lies between Šmarješke Toplice and Šmarjeta in the historical region of Lower Carniola. The municipality is now included in the Southeast Slovenia Statistical Region.

Unmarked grave
Brezovica is the site of an unmarked grave associated with the Second World War. The Sela Grave is located in the woods northwest of the village. It contains the remains of a Hungarian doctor and partisan that was killed by the Partisans in 1943.

References

External links
Brezovica at Geopedia

Populated places in the Municipality of Šmarješke Toplice